Kaichi (written: 嘉一 or 海智) is a masculine Japanese given name. Notable people with the name include:

Kaichi Hirate (1909–1946), Imperial Japanese Army soldier
, Japanese tennis player
, Japanese engineer

Japanese masculine given names